Lynda Riley Adams (later Hunt; June 4, 1920 – February 26, 1997) was a Canadian diver who won three medals in total at the British Empire Games in 1938 and 1950. She competed in the 3 m springboard and 10 m platform at the 1936 Summer Olympics and placed 10th and 19th, respectively.

References

1920 births
1997 deaths
Divers from Vancouver
Olympic divers of Canada
Divers at the 1936 Summer Olympics
Canadian female divers
Divers at the 1938 British Empire Games
Divers at the 1950 British Empire Games
Commonwealth Games medallists in diving
Commonwealth Games silver medallists for Canada
Commonwealth Games bronze medallists for Canada
20th-century Canadian women
Medallists at the 1938 British Empire Games
Medallists at the 1950 British Empire Games